Atlas Records was a jazz record label. It was merged with Polydor Records into "Polydor/Atlas". In 1995, Polydor/Atlas became simply Polydor Records again.

Discography

Jazz record labels